Ander Vilariño Facal (born 6 November 1979 in Hondarribia) is a Spanish auto racing driver that is currently competing in the NASCAR Whelen Euro Series, driving the No. 22 Chevrolet Camaro for DF1 Racing. Vilariño is one of the most successful drivers in NASCAR Whelen Euro Series history. He has won 3 titles (2012, 2013, and 2015) and has 22 race wins in his career.

Vilariño started racing in 1996 in the Formula Renault Campus after having competed in some karting championships. He is the son of former FIA European Hill Climb Champion (1989, 1990, 1991, 1992) and FIA European Hill Climb Championship Trophy Winner (2007) Andrés Vilariño.

Racing career 
Vilarino competed in karting since 1990 until his first race in 1996 in Formula Renault Campus. In 1997, Vilariño was competing in the French Fórmula Renault, but he suffered a big crash in the second race of the season at Nogaro and he had to stop the season. In 1998 he repeated the French Formula Renault. In 1999 Ander raced in rallies and hill climbs in Spain. In 2000 Vilariño won his first national championship, the Spanish Formula Supertoyota Championship. In 2001 he raced in the European Le Mans Series, at the 6 Hours of Estoril. In 2001 he won his second Spanish Championship, the Spanish Formula 3 Championship. Vilarino moved to World Series by Nissan in 2002 and he stayed there until the beginning the 2004, there he left Epsilon Euskadi team for differences with his direction. In World Series Nissan Ander got 2 wins, 3 pole positions and 8 podiums.

Vilariño then moved into the FIA European Hill Climb Championship, there he won the FIA European Hill Cup FIA European Hill Climb Cup in 2005. In 2006 in the first race of the FIA European Hill Climb Championship in Rechberg he suffered an accident that got him out of competition for the whole year. After recovering he came back and won the 2007 FIA Hill Climb en Campeonato de Europa. After 2 full years in Hill Climbs Ander came back to circuit racing being 7th in the European Endurance Challenge VdeV for sport prototypes in 2008. Then in 2009 he finished 3rd but just participating in half of the championship. In 2010 Ander participated in 3 races of the VdeV European Endurance Challenge and won the Basque Rallysprint Championship.

In 2011, he made his stock car racing debut as he raced the FIA Racecar Euro Series (the predecessor of the current NASCAR Whelen Euro Series), finishing 3rd overall in the championship after getting 2 wins, 5 podiums, 3 pole positions and 4 fastest laps in of 12 races. That same year, Ander raced 4 races on the FIA Speed Euroseries and won the first of them at Spa Francorchamps. In 2011 Vilarino also took part in one V de V European Endurance Challenge Race, the Jarama 4 Hours and scored an overall victory in the race. In 2012, Vilariño stayed in the Racecar Euro Series, where he would become the first series champion under official NASCAR sanctioning after he scored 6 race wins and 8 podiums. and he was locked into the 2013 UNOH Battle at the Beach at Daytona International Speedway, finishing 23rd after suffering an engine problem on lap 98.

Vilariño successfully defended his title in 2013, having scored 7 race wins and 10 podiums on his way to win his second Euro Series title. In 2014, Vilariño would narrowly lose the title by just 1 point from Anthony Kumpen, having scored 3 wins and 10 podiums during the course of the season. On the same year, Vilariño would also receive an opportunity to race at the NASCAR K&N Pro Series East race at Watkins Glen, although he would ultimately withdraw from the race itself. The following year, Vilariño would win his third title after scoring 3 wins, 9 top fives and 12 top ten finishes before he left the series at the end of the year to switch to sports car racing in V de V and GT4 European Series.

Vilariño took part in the NASCAR Whelen Euro Series Recruitment Day testing event that was held at the end of the 2018 season, fueling speculations that Vilariño is going to return to the series in 2019. This was later confirmed to be true on 28 March 2019, as Vilariño is announced to be returning to the series after a three-year absence with Racing Engineering for the 2019 season. He would finish the season in fifth place after scoring two victories, both in his home race at Valencia.

In 2020, Vilariño moved to DF1 Racing but did not race that year due to family and business concerns brought on by the COVID-19 pandemic.

Career

NASCAR
(key) (Bold – Pole position awarded by qualifying time. Italics – Pole position earned by points standings or practice time. * – Most laps led.)

K&N Pro Series East

Whelen Euro Series - Elite 1

Spain, France, Portugal 
 1995 Elf Steering Winner
 1996 Formula Renault Campus (la filiére), 4th place, 2 wins, 2 pole positions, 6 fastest laps, 3 podiums.
 1997 Formula Renault International Finals, 4th place.
 1998 Formula Renault (la filiére). Best places: 5th Pau, 5th Ledenon.
 1999 Winner of 3 ice rallies in Andorra Series, winner of Garbi Hill Climb and 2nd in Jaizkibel Hill Climb. 5 Rallies Saxo Cup, best place 3rd in Caja Cantabria, 5 cup best times in stages.
 2000 Spanish Champion Formula Super Toyota, 6 wins, 2 pole positions, 2 fastest laps, 6 podiums.
 2001 Spanish Formula 3 Champion – 6 wins, 9 pole Positions, 8 podiums, 8 fastest laps.
 2005 Winner in Magny Cours French Sport Cars Championship..
 2005 3rd Place Monza Italian Sport Cars Championship.
 2005 Basque Hill Climb Champion.
 2010 Basque Hill Climb Champion.

Europe 
 2001 European Le Mans Series 1000 km Estoril (Porsche GT3). DNF.
 2001 Indoor World Cup Karting (Bercy).
 2002 World Series by Nissan, 1 pole Position, 2 podiums, rookie of the year.
 2003 World Series by Nissan, 2 wins, 2 pole positions, 5 podiums.
 2003 Chosen by Auto Hebdo Sport Circuit Spanish revelation driver.
 2004 FIA European Hill Climb Cup (F3000 Reynard 93D). (2 races), 1 win, 1 2nd place.
 2005 FIA European Hill Climb Cup Champion (F3000 Reynard K01) 6 wins, 5 records, 1 2nd place.
 2006 FIA European Hill Climb Championship. (F3000 Reynard K01). Accident, season lost.
 2007 FIA European Hill Climb Champion (F3000 Reynard K01). 9 wins, 5 Records, 1 2nd place.
 2008 V de V European Endurance Challenge (Norma M20) – 7th place – 1 win, 3 poles, 3 fastest laps. Teammate: Andrés Vilariño.
 2009 V de V European Endurance Challenge (Norma M20) – 3rd place – 2 wins, 1 pole, 2 fastest laps, 3 podiums, raced 4 out of 8 races. Teammate: Andrés Vilariño.
 2011 FIA Speed Euroseries (Norma M20). 4 Races. 1 win, 2 pole positions, 1 fastest laps.
 2011 V de V Endurance Challenge. 1 Race. 1 win, 1 pole position, 1 fastest lap.
 2011 FIA Euro-Racecar Series. 3rd place. 2 wins, 3 pole position, 4 fastest laps, 5 podiums.
 2012 NASCAR Racecar Euro Series Champion – 6 wins, 5 pole positions, 5 fastest laps, 8 podiums.
 2013 NASCAR Whelen Euro Series Champion – 7 wins, 8 pole positions, 8 fastest laps, 8 podiums.
 2014 NASCAR Whelen Euro Series Runner-Up – 4 wins, 7 pole positions, 7 fastest laps, 9 podiums.
 2015 NASCAR Whelen Euro Series Champion – 3 wins, 2 pole positions, 3 fastest laps, 8 podiums.
 2016 V de V Challenge Endurance Proto Champion – 4 wins, 6 podiums.
 2017 V de V Proto Endurance Challenge Champion – 3 wins, 2 pole positions, 3 podiums.
 2017 GT4 European Series Northern Cup Pro-Am class – 1 pole position, 2 podiums.
 2017 GT4 European Series Southern Cup Pro-Am class – 1 podium.
 2019 NASCAR Whelen Euro Series – 2 wins, 2 pole positions, 1 fastest laps, 2 podiums.

Awards 
 2001 – Award Gobierno Vasco and among the best guipuzcoan sportsmen for the APDG
 2003 – Nominated to best sportsman for the APDG, and Award Gobierno Vasco and among the best guipuzcoan sportsmen for the APDG
 2005 – Among the best guipuzcoan sportsmen for the APDG
 2006 – Olympic medal from the Spanish Olympic Committee Comité Olímpico Español
 2007 – Among the best Basque sportsmen El Correo
 2007 – Nominated to best sportsman for the APDG and among the best guipuzcoan sportsmen for the APDG
 2007 – Nominated to best sportsman for Euskadi Irratia.

References

External links 
 Official site Ander Vilariño 
 Official site club Vilariño
 
 

1979 births
Living people
Spanish racing drivers
Formule Campus Renault Elf drivers
European Le Mans Series drivers
Euroformula Open Championship drivers
NASCAR drivers
Racing Engineering drivers
GT4 European Series drivers